Ipiales is a city and Catholic bishopric in Nariño Department, southern Colombia, near the border with Ecuador. Ipiales is located on the high plateau called "Tuquerres e Ipiales," the city lies at a distance of 82 km from Pasto, the department's capital." Ipiales is known as "la ciudad de las nubes verdes" (the city of the green clouds) because sometimes, especially in the afternoon, greenish clouds appear over the city. 
One of the area's favorite foods is the guinea pig or cavy (Cavia porcellus), called kuy or kuwi. 
The economy of this city is based on border trade between Ecuador and Colombia.

Culture and religion 
The municipality's main attraction is the impressive architecture of the Las Lajas Cathedral, the episcopal see of the Roman Catholic Diocese of Ipiales.

One of the biggest festivals is called the "Black and White Carnival". Through this event people from Ipiales celebrate racial diversity. People paint each other with make-up and a white soap, called careoca. Many tourists travel to see this event from all over the country.

History 
The Rumichaca Bridge, according to Spanish chroniclers, was the northernmost outpost of the Inca Empire, wrested from the Pasto people in the early 16th century.

Economy and transport 

The inhabitants of the town of Ipiales are as important economic activities: trade, small businesses, tourism, and in rural areas: agriculture, livestock, minor species. In minerals: oil on Churuyaco jungle, rock quarries and crafts in Las Lajas, topdressing in Old Bridge, clay in the Tejar. Natural resources are abundant throughout its territory.

Ipiales a is land and air border port, with intense trade with the peoples of the former province of Obando and as crossroad for travelers from the Andean Pact countries, especially Ecuador, it is the second most important border in Colombia. There is wide legislation to control the flow of people and vehicles, with international treaties and agreements on economic and border relations in all social cultural and economic, the Neighborhood and Integration Commission Colombo - Ecuador 1989. Republic of Colombia. Neighbourhood Binational Commissions. The Border Integration 1993, the Border Act 1995. The Special Economic Zone Export 2000, to improve the economic, institutional and social of this region, but everything has been "good intentions", as there is no vocation to create business, manufacturing or assembling artifacts, goods or services, for we do not have the infrastructure, equipment or decision for these projects.

The city is served by San Luis Airport.

Geography 

The municipality of Ipiales is the southwest of Colombia, and the Department of Nariño, in the Andean highlands of 'Túquerres and Ipiales. The city is located 3 km from the Colombian-Ecuadorian and 82 km of Pasto. It communicates with the interior by the Pan American Highway, which continues along the Ecuadorian population Tulcán, after crossing the international bridge Rumichaca (Quechua rumi stone, chaka bridge,  "stone bridge") over the river Carchi in Narino territory called Guaytara to 800 meters, from the viewpoint of Ipiales.

 Orographic 
The orographic Ipiales Township are part of Narino highlands, the Guaitara canyon, and the Western Cordillera; Cofanía valley and part of the Amazon basin. The moors: to Mueses and The Palace, the hills: Troy, La Quinta, Culachí, Black, French, Tigre and Pax. The territory of the municipality is slightly wavy with climatic zones: cold, desert, warm, medium, respectively. Geographic Institute "Agustin Codazzi '. T. Andrade, Ob. cit., 1974. The average height of the town is 2900 m, making it Colombia's highest city (although not the highest town) and among the highest cities in the world.

 Hydrography 

Consists of three major watersheds: Jácome Benavides, Julio and others. Diagnosis municipal Ipiales.
 Guáitara River Basin, and its tributaries: Boqueron River in the upper part is broken Doña Juana Blanco River, Carchi, Morro broken, or Pulcas Teques, Orejuela, El Rosario, Cutuaquer. Bishop Mejía says, "but no river Guaytara explored more in our land and dug more in our soul."; Mejia Mejia, JC Villaviciosa Hatunllacta province.  "River engineer" for its dramatic chasms, its spectacular canyon and beautiful landscapes in their journey of 135 miles to its mouth in the Patia River.
 Chingual River Basin, which in its upper part is broken or Chúnquer Pun, and San Francisco River tributaries, Green, Yamués, The Cultún.
 San Miguel River Basin''', and its tributaries: River Churuyaco, Sapoyaco, Rumiyaco, Kerosene, Lora, Rancheria.

 Climate 
Temperatures rarely break the  mark or fall below freezing, giving the city perpetual spring-like weather. Ipiales has a rainier season from October to May and a drier season from June through September.

References

External links 

 

Municipalities of Nariño Department
Colombia–Ecuador border crossings